Kuka is a village in Kapurthala district in Punjab, India. It was the native village of the legendary Baba Harbhajan Singh, a soldier revered by the Indian Army in Sikkim.

References 

Cities and towns in Kapurthala district